There are at least 266 named lakes and reservoirs in Valley County, Montana.

Lakes
 Abey Reservoir, el. 
 Baalke Slough, el. 
 Dry Lake, el. 
 Georges Pond, el. 
 Lake Elbert, el. 
 Lake Grable, el.

Reservoirs
 Access Reservoir, el. 
 Ada Reservoir, el. 
 Aitken Reservoir, el. 
 Aldrin Reservoir, el. 
 Anderson Reservoir, el. 
 Anna Reservoir, el. 
 Archambeault Retention Reservoir, el. 
 Ardis Reservoir, el. 
 Arrambide Reservoir, el. 
 B and H Reservoir, el. 
 Badger Reservoir, el. 
 Badger Reservoir, el. 
 Barb Reservoir, el. 
 Baulk Reservoir, el. 
 Bean Reservoir, el. 
 Bear Tracks Reservoir, el. 
 Beartracks Reservoir, el. 
 Beast Reservoir, el. 
 Beaver Reservoir, el. 
 Beaverhead Reservoir, el. 
 Becky Reservoir, el. 
 Beechnut Reservoir, el. 
 Bend Reservoir, el. 
 Berger Reservoir, el. 
 Big Fork Reservoir, el. 
 Big Rock Detention Reservoir, el. 
 Bird Reservoir, el. 
 Black Calf Reservoir, el. 
 Black Reservoir, el. 
 Blanchard Reservoir, el. 
 Bliss Reservoir, el. 
 Bomber Reservoir, el. 
 Bones Reservoir, el. 
 Book Reservoir, el. 
 Boone Reservoir, el. 
 Boundary Reservoir, el. 
 Browning Reservoir, el. 
 Bubble Reservoir, el. 
 Bud Reservoir, el. 
 Bullhead Reservoir, el. 
 Cabin Reservoir, el. 
 Cactus Flat Detention Reservoir, el. 
 Camp Reservoir, el. 
 Carol Reservoir, el. 
 Carp Reservoir, el. 
 Cat Reservoir, el. 
 Chico Reservoir, el. 
 Chowder Reservoir, el. 
 Christmas Reservoir, el. 
 Cisco Reservoir, el. 
 Clover Reservoir, el. 
 Collins Reservoir, el. 
 Confusion Reservoir, el. 
 Conrad Reservoir, el. 
 Cornwell Reservoir, el. 
 Corral Junction Number 2 Reservoir, el. 
 Corral Junction Number Two Reservoir, el. 
 Corral Reservoir, el. 
 Cottonwood Reservoir, el. 
 Coulee Reservoir, el. 
 Craig Reservoir, el. 
 Crappie Reservoir, el. 
 Cub Reservoir, el. 
 Deep Cut Reservoir, el. 
 Desert Claim Reservoir, el. 
 Dicks Reservoir, el. 
 Dime Reservoir, el. 
 Divide Number Two Reservoir, el. 
 Divide Reservoir, el. 
 Do Reservoir, el. 
 Dodge Reservoir, el. 
 Dog Creek Reservoir, el. 
 Don Reservoir, el. 
 Dont Reservoir, el. 
 Double Crossing Reservoir, el. 
 Double Reservoir, el. 
 Dubbe Reservoir, el. 
 Duck Creek Reservoir, el. 
 Duck Creek Reservoir, el. 
 Duck Soup Reservoir, el. 
 Duet Reservoir, el. 
 Eighteen Reservoir, el. 
 Emory Reservoir, el. 
 Erie Reservoir, el. 
 Far-Nuff Reservoir, el. 
 Finn Reservoir, el. 
 Five Point Reservoir, el. 
 Five Reservoir, el. 
 Flat Drop Reservoir, el. 
 Florence Reservoir, el. 
 Forrest Reservoir, el. 
 Forsman Reservoir, el. 
 Fort Peck Lake, McCone, el. 
 Fort Peck Trout Pond, el. 
 Four Reservoir, el. 
 Frazer Lake, el. 
 Gauge Reservoir, el. 
 Glen Reservoir, el. 
 Gordon Reservoir, el. 
 Grimes Reservoir, el. 
 Grub Detention Reservoir, el. 
 Gutshot Detention Reservoir, el. 
 Half Barrel Reservoir, el. 
 Half Barrel Reservoir, el. 
 Halfpint Reservoir, el. 
 Hamms Reservoir, el. 
 Hardpan Reservoir, el. 
 Hen Reservoir, el. 
 High Moon Reservoir, el. 
 Horace Reservoir, el. 
 Horgan Reservoir, el. 
 Hump Reservoir, el. 
 Hurricane Reservoir, el. 
 Itcaina Reservoir, el. 
 Jack Rabbit Reservoir, el. 
 Jack Reservoir, el. 
 Jan Reservoir, el. 
 January Reservoir, el. 
 Jim Reservoir, el. 
 John Reservoir, el. 
 John Reservoir, el. 
 Jordan Reservoir, el. 
 Judy Reservoir, el. 
 Kaulitski Reservoir, el. 
 Keeney Reservoir, el. 
 Kerney Reservoir, el. 
 Knob Reservoir, el. 
 Knob Reservoir, el. 
 Korman Reservoir, el. 
 Langen Reservoir, el. 
 Last Chance Reservoir, el. 
 Last Reservoir, el. 
 Last Reservoir, el. 
 Lewis Reservoir, el. 
 Loblolly Reservoir, el. 
 Lone Tree Reservoir, el. 
 Lonely Night Reservoir, el. 
 Lori Detention Reservoir, el. 
 Lost McMenomey Reservoir, el. 
 Lower Lone Tree Reservoir, el. 
 Lunch Reservoir, el. 
 Lush Reservoir, el. 
 Luther Reservoir, el.

See also
 List of lakes in Montana

Notes

Bodies of water of Valley County, Montana
ValleyA-L